Smithfield is a suburb of Cairns in the Cairns Region, Queensland, Australia. In the  Smithfield had a population of 5,303 people.

Geography 
The Captain Cook Highway passes through Smithfield and the Kuranda Range Road (the first section of the Kennedy Highway) branches from the Captain Cook Highway at Smithfield.

History 
Irukandji (also known as Yirrgay, Yurrgay, Yirrgandji, Djabuganjdji and Yirgay) is a language of Far North Queensland, particularly the area around the Kuranda Range and Lower Barron River. The Irukandji language region includes the Cairns Region.

Smithfield was first established in 1876, and was a rival for dominance of the area to Cairns at that time. It was named in honour of prospector and explorer, William "Bill" Smith, who had a camp at this place. On Boxing Day 1877, Bill Smith added further notoriety to the town named after him by murdering a man and then shooting himself in the main street. After a devastating flooding of the Barron River on which the settlement was situated during a cyclone in March 1879, the original site was abandoned.

It is now a suburb of Cairns, and is the business and trade centre of the Cairns 'Northern Beaches'.

Smithfield Provisional School opened on 7 May 1900. On 1 January 1909 it became Smithfield State School. It closed in 1964.

Smithfield State High School opened on 24 January 1983.

Smithfield library opened in 1998 and underwent a major refurbishment in 2008.

At the  the suburb recorded a population of 3,707.

In the  Smithfield had a population of 5,303 people.

Education 
Smithfield State High School is a government secondary (7-12) school for boys and girls at O'Brien Road. In 2018, the school had an enrolment of 1,122 students with 99 teachers (96 full-time equivalent) and 48 non-teaching staff (37 full-time equivalent). It includes a special education program.

There are no primary schools in Smithfield. The nearest government primary schools are Carvonica State School in neighbouring Carvonica to the south, Trinity Beach State School in neighbouring Trinity Beach to the north and Yorkeys Knob State School at neighbouring Yorkeys Knob to the east.

The Cairns Campus of James Cook University is in Smithfield.

Facilities 

Smithfield Police Station is at 1119 Captain Cook Highway.

Smithfield Fire Station is a 21 Salvado Drive.

Smithfield Ambulance Station is at 1 Stanton Road.

Smithfield Community Health Centre is at 16 Danbulan Street.

The Animal Protection Society is at 233-239 Mcgregor Road.

Amenities 

Cairns Regional Council operates a library at 70 Cheviot Street.

The Smithfield branch of the Queensland Country Women's Association meets at the CWA Hall on Kamerunga Road, Caravonica. It is between the Caravonica State School and the Australian Armour and Artillery Museum.

Smithfield Shopping Centre is at 150 Captain Cook Highway. The Smithfield Post Office is within the shopping centre.

Northern Cairns Uniting Church is at 47 Cheviot Street.

On Leisure Park Road, there are a number of community facilities including Marlin Coast Recreation Centre, Marlin Coast Swiimming and Fitness Centre, North Queensland Surf Lifesaving, and Ivanhoes Rugby League Club.

Campus Village is a shopping centre on Faculty Close across the Captain Cook Highway from the James Cook University campus.

Attractions 

The lower terminal of the Skyrail Rainforest Cableway is at 6 Skyrail Drive. The cableway takes visitors through the rainforest of the Barron Gorge National Park to Kuranda at the top of the Great Dividing Range.

Tjapukai Aboriginal Cultural Park was at 4 Skyrail Drive. The park demonstrated the authentic culture and traditions of the local Djabugay people. The Tjapukai park closed down in January 2021.

The Australian Armour and Artillery Museum is at 2 Skyrail Drive. It claims to have the largest collection of armoured vehicles and artillery in the Southern Hemisphere.

References

External links

 

Suburbs of Cairns
1876 establishments in Australia
Populated places established in 1876